Traisy Vivien Tukiet (born 17 February 1994) is a Malaysian diver. She competed in the 10 metre platform event at the 2012 Summer Olympics.

References

Malaysian female divers
Divers at the 2012 Summer Olympics
Olympic divers of Malaysia
1994 births
Living people
People from Sarawak
Divers at the 2010 Asian Games
Southeast Asian Games gold medalists for Malaysia
Southeast Asian Games silver medalists for Malaysia
Southeast Asian Games medalists in diving
Competitors at the 2009 Southeast Asian Games
Competitors at the 2011 Southeast Asian Games
Competitors at the 2015 Southeast Asian Games
Asian Games competitors for Malaysia
21st-century Malaysian women